Dinia may refer to:

 Dinia (moth), a genus of moth
 Dinia, a name created by Pakistani nationalist Choudhary Rahmat Ali as an alternative to India
 Dinia, a Roman town, now Digne-les-Bains, France